Miss Universe 1984, the 33rd Miss Universe pageant, was held on 9 July 1984 at the James L. Knight Convention Center in Miami, Florida, United States. Yvonne Ryding of Sweden was crowned by Lorraine Downes of New Zealand. 81 contestants competed in this year. This is the third time that a Swedish woman has won Miss Universe, following Hillevi Rombin in 1955 and Margareta Arvidsson in 1966.

Results

Placements

Final Competition

 Order of Announcements

 Top 10 

 Top 5

Contestants

  - Leila Adar
  - Jacqueline van Putten
  - Donna Rudrum
  - Michaela Nussbaumer
  - Lisa Worme
  - Brigitte Antonia Muyshondt
  - Lisa Patricia Ramirez
  - Rhonda Wilkinson
  - Lourdes Aponte
  - Ana Elisa Flores da Cruz
  - Donna Patricia Frett
  - Cynthia Kereluk
  - Thora Anne Crighton
  - Carol Bahnke Muñoz
  - Susana Caldas Lemaitre
  - Margaret Brown
  - Silvia Portilla
  - Susanne Marie Verbrugge
  - Zsa Zsa Melodias
  - Catarina Clausen
  - Sumaya Heinsen
  - Leonor Gonzenbach
  - Ana Lorena Samagoa
  - Louise Gray
  - Anna-Liisa Tilus
  - Martine Robine
  - Rose Nicole Lony
  - Mirabel Carayol
  - Brigitta Berx
  - Jessica Palao
  - Peggy Dogani
  - Martine Seremes
  - Eleanor Benavente
  - Ilma Urrutia
  - Nancy Neede
  - Myrtice Elitha Hyde
  - Joyce Godenzi
  - Berglind Johansson
  - Juhi Chawla
  - Patricia Nolan
  - Sapir Koffmann
  - Raffaella Baracchi
  - Megumi Niiyama
  - Lim Mi-sook
  - Susan El Sayed
  - Romy Bayeri
  - Latifah Abdul Hamid
  - Marisa Sammut
  - Danielle Clery
  - Elizabeth Broden
  - Petra Harley Peters
  - Tania Clague
  - Porsche Salas
  - Ingrid Marie Martens
  - Cilinia Prada Acosta
  - Patricia Mirisa
  - Elena Ortiz
  - Fiorella Ferrari
  - Maria Desiree "Des" Ereso Verdadero
  - Joanna Karska
  - Maria de Fatima Jardim
  - Sandra Beauchamp Roche
  - Marie Lise Gigan
  - May Monaghan
  - Violet Lee Hui Min
  - Letitia Snyman
  - Garbiñe Abasolo
  - Yvonne Ryding
  - Silvia Anna Afolter
  - Savinee Pakaranang
  - Gina Marie Tardieu
  - Gurcin Ulker
  - Deborah Lindsey
  - Yissa Pronzatti
  - Mai Shanley
  - Patricia Graham
  - Carmen María Montiel
  - Jane Anne Riley
  - Lena Slade
  - Kresinja Borojevic
  - Lokange Lwali

Celebrity judges 
 Constance Towers - actress
 Johnny Yune
 Carolina Herrera - fashion designer
 William Haber
 Karen Baldwin - Miss Universe 1982 winner
 Ronny Cox - actor
 Lucía Méndez
 Marcus Allen - NFL player
 Linda Christian
 Harry Guardino
 Maria Tallchief
 Alan Thicke - TV personality/singer/actor

Notes

Returns
Last competed in 1959:
 
Last competed in 1972:
 
Last competed in 1976:
 
Last competed in 1977:
 
Last competed in 1979:

Withdrawals
  - Pamela Lois Parker withdrew after the Miss Bahamas Committee boycotted the contest due to South Africa being allowed to participate and send a representative.
  - Titi Dwi Jayati
  - Nilmini Iddamalgoda who was depressed and homesick.
  - Competed as South Africa since then.

Awards
  - Miss Amity (Jessica Palao)
  - Miss Photogenic (Garbiñe Abasolo)
  - Best National Costume (Juhi Chawla)

Host City controversy
Initially, Calgary, Alberta, Canada was chosen as host city for the pageant, a decision announced on March 13, 1984. Funding issues arose within days when the city council would not allow the tourist bureau to commit permanent funds to the event. An agreement was reached whereby funds from the city could be used but had to be repaid, although some complained about "using sex to sell the city". By late April there were indications that the pageant might be moved to Miami, Florida due to the continued financial issues, but that negotiations in the hope of Calgary retaining the event were ongoing. Despite the attempts of Calgary's Tourist Bureau, Miami was officially announced as the new venue on 12 May 1984, a decision which cost Calgary $125,000 and left the city facing a potential lawsuit from Miss Universe Inc., the pageant owner.

General references

References

External links
Miss Universe official website

1984
1984 in the United States
1984 beauty pageants
Beauty pageants in the United States
1984 in Florida
Events in Miami
July 1984 events in the United States